Triveni may refer to:

 Triveni (poetry), a form of Hindi and Urdu poetry
 Triveni, Bajura, a municipality in Bajura District, Nepal
 Triveni Express, an express train located in India
 Triveni Supermarkets, a chain of retail supermarkets in Kerala, India
 A grove of trees sacred to Indian-origin religions: banyan, peepal, and neem

People
 Triveni Acharya, Indian journalist and activist living in Mumbai
 Triveni Singh (1978–2004), Indian soldier from 5 Jammu and Kashmir Light Infantry
 Anasuya Shankar (1928–1963), a Kannada novelist known as Triveni

See also
 Triveni Rural Municipality (disambiguation), rural municipalities of Nepal
 
 Thriveni, a Malayalam-language film
 Tribeni (disambiguation)